Øbjerggaard is a manor house and estate situated east of Køng, midway between Næstved and Vordingborg some  south of Copenhagen, Denmark. One of 12 new manors created when Vordingborg Cavalry District was dissolved in 1774, it was initially the site of a textile factory established by Niels Ryberg. The old headquarters of the textile factory,  (Old Øbjerggaard), constructed by Ruberg in 1780 and listed on the Danish registry of protected buildings and places in 1945, is now home to Køng Museum. The current owner of the estate, Peter Eriksen Oxholm Tillisch, resides at Rosenfeldt, his other estate, while Ny Øbjerggaard is operated as a bed and breakfast.

History

Crown land
It belonged to Køng Gårde, a small hamlet of just three farms owned by the Crown. The bailiff of Hammer Herred, Jacob Gad, resided in one of the three farms. The land was included in Vordingborg Cavalry District in 17151717.

Ryberg and Køng Textile Factory
In 1774, Vordingborg Cavalry District was divided into 12 estates and sold at public auction. Estate No. 4, with an area of 283 ,  was given the name Øbjerggaard and included Køng Church. The name referred to Øbjerg, a small hill in the otherwise flat landscape, situated approximately 200 m from the current main building. The auction took place at Vordingvorg Castle on 27 September. Øbjerggaard was sold to Ditlev Staal, owner of Klintholm Manor on Møn.

 
On 31 December 1778, it was  disclosed that Staal had acted as a straw man on behalf of the prominent Copenhagen-based businessman Niels Ryberg. Ryberg had already taken over the management of the estate at that time. His intention was to turn it into a centre for textile production.

Ryberg was part of the royal textile mill in Kongens Lyngby back in 1774. On 3 January 1776, Ryberg published a report on the economic advantages of promoting local industry in Denmark. Later the same year, the crown had pulled out of the textile mill in Kongens Lyngby. It was probably at this point that Ryberg had conceived the idea of starting a textile mill on the Øbjerggaard estate. Ryberg hired Christian Gottfried Voelker (1746–1819) from Thüringen, who had managed a spinning plant in Husum from 1773 to 1777, as manager of the estate and industrial venture. The land was planted with flax. A symmetrical complex of half-timbered buildings was constructed around a hexagonal courtyard. The buildings included a dairy, barn, stable, brewery and a forge as well as a forester's house situated a little further to the north. A house for the inspector (now Gammel Øbjerggaard) was constructed at the other end of a tree-lined avenue.

In 1781–1783, Ryberg and Voelker constructed two buildings with 14 and eight looms, respectively, adjacent to Gammel Øbjerggaard. Ivar Christian Thorning was hired as weaving master at the same time. The production of linen started in 1783. The factory was an instant success and had to be expanded several times. From 1784, it also had to import most of the flax from England and Germany. A sister factory was also established in Dragør where part of the canvas production took place. A new building with 24 looms was constructed at Gammel Øbjerggaard.

By 1786, Køng Textile Factory's spinning plants had reached a production of 16,000 pounds while the looms produced 27,660 ells of canvas,  and damask (10,000 pounds). The factory employed 25 weavers, 9 , 14 spoolers and three other workers as well as 370 spinning women in the area. Ryberg had by then invested 20,000 rigsdaler in the factory. He also received a loan of 40,000  from the state as well as another loan of 30,000  for the construction of a bleaching plant in Vintersbølle east of Vordingborg. The factory was the largest supplier of home textiles and linen to the royal court but the products were also exported to the West Indies and America.

The Øbjerggaard estate was upon Ryberg's death passed to his son Johan Christian Ryberg (1767–1832) in 1804.

In 1836, Øbjerggaard was sold by the state to Christian Ludvig Klingenberg. His wife Marie Augusta Dinesen was the daughter of Jens Kraft Dinesen, owner of nearby Kragerup Manor. She sold Øbjerggaard five years after the death of her husband in 1840. Their eldest daughter Ulricha was married to professor of medicine Sophus Egelsted.

Buchwald family
The new owner was Frederik von Buchwald (1790–1874), an army captain and the owner of Anneberggaard in Odsherred. On his death, Øbjerggaard passed to his son Carl Valdemar von Buchwald (1818–1887). In 1846, Gammel Øbjerggaard was struck by fire. Buchwald constructed a new main building on the site of the home farm at the other end of the tree-lined avenue. It was a one-storey building, 17 bays wide and 16 ells deep, with a red tile roof. In 1851, he moved Køng Textile Factory to Vintersbølle.

Changing owners
Buchwald was married to Christine Johanne Marie Aarestrup (1822–1910). In 1889 she sold the estate to J. W. C. Krieger. He fell ill and moved to Italy but his wife remained on the estate. In 1918, it was sold to Aage Faye. In 1918, Faye sold Øbjerggaard and a few years later purchased Birkendegård. The new owners of Øbjerggaard were Knud and Valdemar Hansen. The estate changed hands several times over the next two decades.

Sonne and the Tillisch family
 

In 1933, Øbjerggaard was acquired by the New York-based banker Hans Christian Sonne (1891–1971). His father Christian Sonne (1859–1941), a politician, had first been manager of Knuthenborg Avlsgård and later Rosenlund at Sakskøbing.

Sonne's sister Thora Mathilde (1889–1966) was married to Henrik Wilhelm Tillisch (1888–1979) (a great grandson of Georg Frederik Tillisch) who served as manager of Øbjerggaard from 1936. In 1956, he purchased the estate from his brother-in-law. In 1974, he ceded it  to his sons Holger (1921–2000) and Erik (1925–2007). In 1995, it was passed to Erik Tillisch's son Peter.

Architecture
Buchwald's main building from 1848 was a one-storey building, 17 bays wide and 16 ells deep, with a red tile roof. A staircase addition with a slate roof was added in 1864. It was heightened by Krieger in 18921893. In 1933, Sonne commissioned local master carpenter H. P. Nielsen to expand the entire building by one storey.

The main building is flanked by two half-timbered buildings from Ryberg's original complex from the 1770s.

Gammel Øbjerggaard is a long Neoclassical building with a central wall dormer. It was listed in the Danish registry of protected buildings and places in 1918.

Today
The estate is currently owned by Eriksen Oxholm Tillisch. Ny Øbjerggaard is operated as a bed and breakfast.

List of owners
 ( –1774) The Crown
 (1774) Ditlev Staal
 (1774–1804) Niels Ryberg
 (1804–1820) Johan Christian Ryberg
 (1820–1836) The state
 (1836–1840) Christian Ludvig Klingenberg
 (1840–1845) Augusta Klingenberg, née Dinesen
 (1845–1854) Frederik Buchwald
 (1854–1887) Carl Valdemar Buchwald
 (1887–1889) Christine Johanne Marie Buchwald, née Aarestrup
 (1889–1913) J.W.C. Krieger
 (1913–1918) Aage Faye
 (1918–1920) Knud Hansen
 (1918–1920) Valentin Hansen
 (1920–1925) J. Brabæk
 (1925–1926) Udstykningsforeningen
 (1926–1931) W. Kjær
 (1931–1933) J.E. Nielsen
 (1933–1956) Hans Christian Sonne
 (196?–1974)  Henrik Wilhelm Tillisch
 (1974–1995) Erik and Holger Tillisch
 (1995–present) Peter Eriksen Oxholm Tillisch

References

Further reading
 Schovsbo, Per Ole: Køng Fabrik 1774–1924. Om industrieventyret i Sydsjælland. Køng Museums Støtteforening / Museum Sydøstdanmark (202).

External links
 Official website
 Source
 Vontersbølle

Manor houses in Vordingborg Municipality
Houses completed in 1848
Hotels in Denmark